Tango is a ballet made by New York City Ballet co-founder and founding choreographer George Balanchine to Stravinsky's Tango (1940) arranged 1953 by the composer. The premiere took place June 10, 1982, as part of City Ballet's Stravinsky Centennial Celebration at the New York State Theater, Lincoln Center.

Original cast 

Karin von Aroldingen
Christopher d'Amboise

Reviews 
June 11th, 1982 Anna Kisselgoff, NY Times

Articles 
February 13th, 1984 John J. O'Connor, NY Times

Ballets by George Balanchine
New York City Ballet repertory
1982 ballet premieres
Ballets to the music of Igor Stravinsky
New York City Ballet Stravinsky Centennial Celebration